Visentini is an Italian surname. Notable people with the surname include:

Antonio Visentini (1688–1782), Italian architect, painter and engraver
Bruno Visentini (1914–1995), Italian politician
Luca Visentini (born 1969), Italian trade unionist and poet
Roberto Visentini (born 1957), Italian cyclist

See also
Cantiere Navale Visentini, Italian shipbuilder

Italian-language surnames